NK Imotski is a Croatian football club based in the town of Imotski, in the region of Dalmatia. As of 2020, the club competes in the First County Football League (Croatia), fifth level of Croatian football.

History
NK Imotski were founded in 1991. They played several years in the 2. HNL, the Croatian second division, being relegated in 2013 and again in 2017.

Stadium
Imotski play in the  Gospin dolac, which has been named among the most beautiful stadiums in the world by media outlets including the BBC.

References

External links
Official website 
NK Imotski at Nogometni magazin 

Association football clubs established in 1991
Football clubs in Croatia
Football clubs in Split-Dalmatia County
1991 establishments in Croatia
Sport in Imotski